Jean Crespon (14 October 1797, Nîmes – 1 August 1857) was a French zoologist and naturalist.

Born into a poor family, he worked as a barber, soldier, and poet before becoming a taxidermist and turning to natural history. In 1840 he published his Ornithologie du Gard et des pays circonvoisins (Ornithology of Gard and Environs), a book that covered 321 species of birds. The book earned the praise of naturalists that included Isidore Geoffroy Saint-Hilaire (1805-1861).

In 1844 Crespon published the two-volume La Faune méridionale (Mediterranean Wildlife), in which he described 27 new species.

Crespon's natural history collections passed to the Muséum d'histoire naturelle in Nîmes on his death.

Works about Jean Crespon 
 "Nos ornithologistes. Jean Crespon, 1797-1857," by Albert Hugues (Garnier-Chaboussant, 1922).

References 
 This article is based on the article in French Wikipedia: 
 Maurice Boubier, L’Évolution de l’ornithologie, Paris, Alcan, coll. « Nouvelle collection scientifique », 1925, ii + 308 p.
 René Ronsil, Bibliographie ornithologique française, t. 1 : Bibliographie, Paris, Lechevalier, 1948 (n° 690).

1797 births
1857 deaths
French zoologists
People from Nîmes